

Austin (Gussie) Russell (1917, Doonagore, Doolin – 18 May 2004, Ennistymon Hospital) was a stonecutter and a well known Irish traditional flute and whistle player out of Doolin, County Clare, Ireland. He was one of the three Russell brothers to earn fame as a musician, together with his brothers Micho and Packie.

Gussie learned to play music at a very young age, learning most of his skills from his neighbour Patrick Flanagan, a concertina player. He and Micho got their first concert flutes from their uncle John Moloney in 1932, when he returned from the United States.

Gussie and his brothers first got attention outside Doolin due to the work of the Irish Folklore Commission. In the late 1930s Seamus O'Duillearga was active in County Clare and recorded stories and music, including music of the Russell brothers. Later recordings by others also brought them a wider public.

Personal
He was born as one of five children of Austin Russell and Annie Moloney. He had two brothers and two sisters.

Gussie Russell's main occupation was as stone cutter in the quarry at Doonagore. Besides being a gifted musician, he was also a gifted tradesman and mechanic.

Recordings

With brothers
 The Russell Family of Doolin, Co. Clare; Micho, Packie and Gussie Russell. Recorded by John Tams and Neil Wayne in O'Connor's Bar, Doolin January 1974. Published in 1975 by Topic Records.

Anthologies
 Farewell to Lissycasey: The Traditional Music of County Clare; 1995
 Treasure Of My Heart: Classic, 1998

References

External links
 YouTube clip Playing from left to right: Gussie's brother Packie Russel (concertina), Gussie Russell (concert flute), John Killourhy (fiddle), Rory O´Connor (whistle), Stevie McNamara (tambourine) and Willie 'Bheag' Shannon (fiddle).

Irish flautists
Musicians from County Clare
1917 births
2004 deaths
20th-century flautists